Amok is the debut album by the supergroup Atoms for Peace, released on February 25, 2013 by XL Recordings. It features Radiohead singer Thom Yorke (vocals, keyboards, programming and guitars), Radiohead producer Nigel Godrich (production and programming), Red Hot Chili Peppers bassist Flea, drummer Joey Waronker and percussionist Mauro Refosco. It combines electronic and live instrumentation.

Yorke formed Atoms for Peace in 2009 to perform songs from his first solo album, The Eraser (2006). After the tour ended, the band spent three days jamming and recording original material in a Los Angeles studio. Yorke and Godrich edited and arranged the recordings over two years, combining them with Yorke's electronic music.

Four Amok singles were released: "Default", "Ingenue", "Judge, Jury and Executioner" and "Before Your Very Eyes", with music videos for "Ingenue" and "Before Your Very Eyes". The album received generally favourable reviews, though some critics found it too similar to Yorke's solo work. It reached the top ten in several countries, including the UK, US, and Japan. It was followed by an international tour.

Background and recording

Thom Yorke formed Atoms for Peace in 2009 to perform songs from his first solo album, The Eraser (2006). After the tour ended in 2010, the band spent three days jamming and recording original material in a Los Angeles studio. The members bonded over a shared love of afrobeat, such as the music of Fela Kuti.

Describing his role in the sessions as "conducting", Yorke would show the band electronic music he had created and they would recreate it with live instruments. He said: "The music I do on my laptop is so angular. When you get people to play like that, it's so peculiar ... One of the things we were most excited about was ending up with a record where you weren't quite sure where the human starts and the machine ends." Yorke and producer Nigel Godrich edited and arranged the recordings over two years, combining them with Yorke's electronic music.

Promotion and release
Amok was released on February 25, 2013 by XL Recordings. The first single, "Default", was released as a download on September 10, 2012. "Judge, Jury and Executioner", was released as a download on January 7, 2013 and on vinyl on March 19, 2013. "Before Your Very Eyes" was released as the third single on July 1, 2013. On February 18, 2013, Amok was made available to stream from the Atoms for Peace website.

A music video for "Ingenue" was released via YouTube on February 28, 2013. It was directed by Garth Jennings and choreographed by Wayne McGregor, who both had worked with Yorke on the video for the 2011 Radiohead song "Lotus Flower". On October 17, a video for "Before Your Very Eyes" was released, directed by Andrew Thomas Huang. Amok was followed by a tour of Europe, the US and Japan.

Sales 
Amok reached the top ten in several countries, including the UK, US, and Japan. In the US, it was beaten to the number-one spot by Bruno Mars's album Unorthodox Jukebox. Yorke blamed an Amazon promotion selling the Mars album for $1.99, and said: "Amazon fucks with us every time. They undercut us."

Critical reception

Amok has a score of 76 out of 100 on review aggregate site Metacritic, indicating "generally favourable reviews". Alexis Petridis of The Guardian wrote that Amok was technically "hugely impressive ... its sound is rich and deep, full of intriguing shifts and contrasts ... When Amok works, the results are spectacular." However, he felt "the painstaking process used to create it may have assumed a greater importance than the business of actually writing songs".

Several critics criticised Amok as too similar to Yorke's solo albums. Slant wrote that "with such richly diverse membership, it's disappointing that Atoms for Peace is so highly derivative of Yorke and Godrich's recent work". The review concluded that Amok was "essentially a collection of agile, minimalist rock songs with a handful of interesting but ultimately superficial electronica flourishes". Pitchfork wrote that while Amok was more "colourful and layered" than The Eraser, it felt "strangely static and contained, giving a perpetual sense of jogging in place". Sputnikmusic found that it "rarely escapes" sounding like a Yorke album, but that "the average listener might find something to enjoy within the dense, layered folds".

In a retrospective piece for the album's 10th anniversary, the Stereogum writer Ryan Leas argued that Amok had failed to distinguish itself as its own project, and could "just as easily be seen as Yorke’s second solo album" or a continuation of Radiohead's 2011 album The King of Limbs. He wrote: "For all that went into it Amok was mostly a collection of very good Yorke solo songs — not so much a bold evolution ... Ten years on, it feels as if the 'beginning' Yorke once saw in Atoms For Peace's debut will in fact become a one-off oddity." He suggested that Yorke's later project the Smile presented a truer development of his work.

Track listing

Personnel

Atoms for Peace
Thom Yorke – vocals, keyboards, programming, guitars
Nigel Godrich – production, programming
Joey Waronker – drums
Mauro Refosco – percussion
Flea – bass

Additional personnel
Darrell Thorp – live recording engineering
Drew Brown – additional engineering
Stanley Donwood – artwork ("lost Angeles lost")
Brian Gardner – mastering

Chart positions

Weekly charts

Singles

References

External links

2013 debut albums
Atoms for Peace (band) albums
XL Recordings albums
Albums produced by Nigel Godrich